The  San Diego Chargers season was the franchise's eleventh overall season and first season in the National Football League (NFL). As a result of the NFL-AFL Merger, where the league was broken into two conferences, each member of the American Football League was moved into the American Football Conference.

San Diego's 5-6-3 record was the first of seven consecutive losing seasons for the franchise. The 1970 Chargers are the last NFL team to record three ties in a single season, a record which will likely stand, as since the NFL adopted overtime for regular season games in 1974 no team has recorded more than one tie in a season.

Offseason

NFL Draft

Roster

Regular season

Schedule 

Note: Intra-division opponents are in bold text.

Game summaries

Week 13: at Denver Broncos

Standings

Awards and honors

References 

San Diego Chargers
San Diego Chargers seasons
San Diego Chargers season